Thomas Lawson or Tom Lawson may refer to:
Thomas B. Lawson (1807–1888), American painter
Thomas G. Lawson (1835–1912), U.S. Representative from Georgia
Thomas J. Lawson (born 1957), Chief of the Defence Staff of the Canadian Armed Forces.
Thomas W. Lawson (businessman) (1857–1925), American businessman and author
Thomas Lawson (artist) (born 1951), artist, writer and dean of California Institute of the Arts
Thomas Lawson (military physician) (1789–1861), American military physician
Thomas Lawson (botanist) (1630–1691), English botanist and Quaker
Thomas George Lawson, Popo prince from modern-day Togo who served in the senior civil service of Sierra Leone
E. Thomas Lawson (born 1931), research scientist at the Institute of Cognition and Culture at Queen's University Belfast

Tom Lawson (ice hockey) (born 1979), Canadian ice hockey player
Thomas R. Lawson, RPI Grand Marshal, 1897–1898
Thomas Lawson, fullback for the 2007 Nebraska Cornhuskers football team
Tom Lawson, Green Party of Canada candidate; see Green Party candidates, 2004 Canadian federal election

See also
Thomas W. Lawson (ship), a 1902 seven-masted steel-hulled schooner named after Thomas W. Lawson

Lawson, Thomas